City of oblast significance (or importance) is a type of an administrative division in some countries of the former Soviet Union.
in Russia; see city of federal subject significance
in Ukraine; see city of regional significance (Ukraine)